Bisheh may refer to:
 Bisheh, Hormozgan
 Bisheh, Khuzestan
 Bisheh-e Sorkh, Khuzestan Province
 Bisheh Bozan, Khuzestan Province
 Bisheh Dulang, Khuzestan Province
 Bisheh, Kohgiluyeh and Boyer-Ahmad
 Bisheh, Lorestan
 Bisheh, Khusf, South Khorasan Province
 Bisheh, Nehbandan, South Khorasan Province
 Bisheh, Sarbisheh, South Khorasan Province
 Bisheh, Yazd

See also
 Bisheh Khazan